Van Khanh may refer to:

Vạn Khánh, a commune (xã) and village in Vạn Ninh District, Khánh Hòa Province, in Southeast Vietnam
Vân Khánh, a Vietnamese traditional folk singer